St. Paraskevi's Church is a church in Hllomo, Gjirokastër County, Albania. It is a Cultural Monument of Albania.

References

Cultural Monuments of Albania
Buildings and structures in Dropull